The Bankers (Ireland) Act 1845 is an Act of the Parliament of the United Kingdom, which regulated the repayment of sums towards the Governor and Company of the Bank of Ireland for the public service.

United Kingdom Acts of Parliament 1845
Financial regulation in the United Kingdom
Currency law in the United Kingdom